Chazara is a butterfly genus from the subfamily Satyrinae of the brush-footed butterfly family (Nymphalidae). The most well-known is the hermit butterfly (C. briseis). C. briseis can be found as far west as Morocco and as far eastward as Mongolia. They inhabit the Tian Shan mountain range of Central Asia, also known as the Celestial Mountains, which are fabled in Daoist literature as the place where the Goddess of the West attends to the Peaches of Immortality.

Selected species
 Chazara bischoffii (Herrich-Schäffer, [1846]) – orange hermit
 Chazara briseis (Linnaeus, 1764) – hermit butterfly
 Chazara egina Staudinger, [1892] – Anatolian witch
 Chazara eitschbergeri Lukhtanov, 1999
 Chazara enervata (Alpheraky, 1881)
 Chazara heydenreichi (Lederer, 1853)
 Chazara kaufmanni (Erschoff, 1874)
 Chazara persephone (Hübner, [1805]) – dark rockbrown
 Chazara prieuri (Pierret, 1837) – southern hermit
 Chazara rangontavica Shchetkin, 1981
 Chazara staudingeri (Bang-Haas, 1882)

External links
Satyrinae of the Western Palearctic

 
Satyrini
Butterfly genera
Taxa named by Frederic Moore